Elections to Barrow-in-Furness Borough Council were held on 2 May 2002. One third of the council was up for election and the council stayed under no overall control.

After the election, the composition of the council was
Labour 19
Conservative 15
Independent 3
Others 1

Election result

Ward results

References
2002 Barrow-in-Furness election result
 Ward results

2002 English local elections
2002
2000s in Cumbria